Tocache is a town in Northern Peru, capital of the province Tocache in the region San Martín. There were 23,511 inhabitants according to the 2007 census.

References

External links
Satellite map at Maplandia

Populated places in the San Martín Region